The Mobu language, Mobumrin, is a Kru language spoken by ethnic Aizi (Ahizi) on the shores of Ébrié Lagoon in Ivory Coast. It is not intelligible with Lele (Tiagba), also spoken by Aizi at the lagoon.

The endonym is Mobuin, and the name for all Aizi is Frukpu.

References

Kru languages
Languages of Ivory Coast
Languages of Africa